The Rambhola High School is an all-boys, Higher Secondary school in Cooch Behar, West Bengal, India.  The school, established in 1941, is affiliated to the West Bengal Board of Secondary Education & West Bengal Council of Higher Secondary Education.

See also
Education in West Bengal

References

External links

Boys' schools in India
High schools and secondary schools in West Bengal
Schools in Cooch Behar district
Educational institutions established in 1941
1941 establishments in India